Jewish demography may refer to:

Historical Jewish population comparisons
Jewish population - for the current position